Yefferson Moreira Scaraffoni (born March 7, 1991) is a Uruguayan footballer who plays for C.A. Bella Vista.

Career
Moreira began his career in 2009 with Peñarol.

References

1991 births
Living people
People from Artigas Department
Uruguayan footballers
Uruguay under-20 international footballers
Association football defenders
Uruguayan Primera División players
Uruguayan Segunda División players
Peñarol players
C.A. Cerro players
El Tanque Sisley players
Club Atlético River Plate (Montevideo) players
C.A. Rentistas players
Atlético Pantoja players
Villa Teresa players
C.A. Bella Vista players